Nipissing may refer to the following places in Ontario, Canada:

 Lake Nipissing
 The Nipissing First Nation
 Nipissing 10, reserve of Nipissing First Nation
 Nipissing District, a census division
 West Nipissing, an incorporated municipality in Nipissing District
 Nipissing River in Algonquin Provincial Park, a tributary of the Petawawa River
 Nipissing Township, in Parry Sound District
 Nipissing University in North Bay
 Electoral districts:
 Nipissing (electoral district), a former federal electoral district
 Nipissing (provincial electoral district), a current provincial electoral district
 Nipissing—Timiskaming, a current federal electoral district

Other
Nipissing Great Lakes, a prehistoric lake
, an 1887 steamship, still in service as RMS Segwun